Anzhelika Pylkina (born 9 August 1990) is a Swedish pair skater. She teamed up with Niklas Hogner in 2003. They were the first Swedish pairs team to compete internationally since 1962. They twice placed 5th at the World Junior Championships and won three bronze medals on the Junior Grand Prix circuit. They won the bronze medal at the 2006 Nebelhorn Trophy and won the Nordic Championships.

They ended their partnership in 2007.

Programs 
(with Hogner)

Results 
(with Hogner)

References

External links 

 

Swedish female pair skaters
1990 births
Russian emigrants to Sweden
Figure skaters from Saint Petersburg
Living people